St Benet (an abbreviation for St Benedict) or St Benet's may refer to:

 St Benet's, Paul's Wharf, a Welsh Anglican church in the City of London, England
 St Benet's Abbey, a medieval monastery in Norfolk, England
 St Benet's Chapel, Netherton, in Liverpool, England
 St Bene't's Church, in Cambridge, England
 St Benet's College, the 14th–19th century name of Corpus Christi College, Cambridge
 St Benet's Hall, Oxford, a hall of the University of Oxford, England 
 St Benet's Multi Academy Trust, serving schools in the Diocese of Norwich, England

See also
 
 
 
 Benet (disambiguation)
 St Benet Fink, a former church and parish in the City of London, England
 St Benet Fink Church, Tottenham, in Tottenham, London, England
 St Benet Gracechurch, a former church in the City of London, England
 St Benet Sherehog, a former church in the City of London, England